Helvetia is a Neotropical genus of the spider family Salticidae (jumping spiders). The genus name is derived from Helvetia.

Systematics
Helvetia is a small genus belonging to the subfamily Salticinae. Currently, it comprises eleven valid species.

 Helvetia albovittata Simon, 1901 – Paraguay, Argentina, Galapagos Islands
 Helvetia cancrimana (Taczanowski, 1872) – Brazil, Argentina, French Guiana
 Helvetia galianoae Ruiz & Brescovit, 2008 – Argentina
 Helvetia humillima Mello-Leitão, 1943 – Brazil
 Helvetia insularis (Banks, 1902) – junior synonym of Helvetia albovittata
 Helvetia labiata Ruiz & Brescovit, 2008 – Brazil
 Helvetia rinaldiae Ruiz & Brescovit, 2008 – Brazil
 Helvetia riojanensis Galiano, 1965 – Argentina
 Helvetia roeweri (Soares & Camargo, 1948)
 Helvetia santarema Peckham & Peckham, 1894 – Brazil, Argentina
 Helvetia semialba (Simon, 1901) – Brazil
 Helvetia stridulans Ruiz & Brescovit, 2008 – Brazil
 Helvetia zebrina Simon, 1901 – junior synonym of Helvetia cancrimana
 Helvetia zonata Simon, 1901 – junior synonym of Helvetia cancrimana

Footnotes

References
  (2008): Revision of Helvetia (Araneae: Salticidae: Heliophaninae). Revista Brasileira de Zoologia 25(1): 139–147.
  (2009): The world spider catalog, version 9.5. American Museum of Natural History.

External links
 Color drawing of Helvetia species from Brazil

Salticidae
Spiders of South America
Salticidae genera